Yishan Li (born 1981) is a Chinese-British comics and manhua illustrator. She is self-taught. Li has worked on popular comic book titles such as Hellboy, Batwoman, and Buffy the Vampire Slayer. She describes her own comics as "'girly stuff' ... ranging from historical detective dramas to young girls' adventure stories".

In 2019, Lexus UK commissioned Li and two other artists to create manga-esque artwork showcasing the company's "latest and most important cars." Li drew a woman sitting on top of a Lexus UX compact SUV, enjoying the sunset after a long day at work. She was inspired by the UX's "New Horizons" tagline.

In 2020, Li illustrated a graphic novel about Frankenstein author Mary Shelley's fictional descendant, a teenage goth girl named Mary. The American Library Association selected the comic as one of its 2021 Great Graphic Novels for Teens.

Works

 New Start, Beijing Comic, China, 1999
 In My Memory, Youth Comic, China, 2002
 Our Dormitory, Comic King, China, 2003
 Snow Demon, Yaoi Press, USA, 2005
 Spirit Marked, Yaoi Press, USA, 2005
 Aluria Chronicles, Yaoi Press, USA, 2006
 Dark Mists #4, Markosia, UK, 2006
 Guardians #1, Qtk Anime, USA, 2006
 Reluctant Saviour, Yaoi Press, USA, 2006
 The Traitor, Mangaquake, UK, 2006
 The Tizzle Sisters & Erik, Markosia, UK, 2006 (coloring)
 Midnight Blue, Demented Dragon, USA, 2007
 Tribolo—L'incroyable Aventure, 70ans Loterie Romande, Switzerland, 2007
 Adventures Of CG!, Cosmogirl Magazine, USA, August 2007 – May 2008, monthly
 Cutie B #1, Dargard, France, March, 2008
 Les Contes Du Boudoir Hante #1, Delcourt, France, May, 2008
 500 Manga Creatures, Ilex, May, 2008
 Call Of The Deep, Barringtonstoke, May, 2008
 Les Contes Du Boudoir Hante #2, Delcourt, France, October, 2008
 Cutie B #2, Dargard, France, October, 2008
 Manga Females Clip Art, Ilex Press, UK, 2009; Andrews Mcmeel, USA, 2009
 How To Draw Manga And Anime, Bridgewater Books, UK, 2009
 The Complete Shojo Art Kit, Ilex Press, UK, 2009; Watson-Guptill, USA, 2009
 Shoujo Art Studio, Watson-Guptill, USA, 2009
 Shonen Art Studio, Watson-Guptill, USA, 2009
 Les Contes Du Boudoir Hante #3, Delcourt, France, 2010
 The Clique, Yen Press, USA, 2010
 One Million Manga Characters, Andrews Mcmeel, USA, 2010
 500 Manga Villains And Heroes, Harper Collins, USA, 2010
 Mini Manga Series, Search Press, UK, 2010-2012
 Will Supervillains Be On The Final?, Del Rey, USA, 2011
 Accro du Shopping (comic version of Confessions of a Shopaholic), Jungle/Casterman, France, 2012
 Paradox Girl, Top Cow, USA, 2016
 Mary: The Adventures of Mary Shelley's Great-Great-Great-Great-Great-Granddaughter, Six Foot Press, USA, 2020

References

External links
 
 Interview with Lexus UK Magazine
 Interview with First Comics News
 Interview with 2000 AD

1981 births
British comics artists
British female comics artists
Chinese comics artists
Chinese female comics artists
Female comics writers
Living people